The Binaytara Foundation (BTF) was established in 2007 by Dr. Binay Shah and wife Tara Shah with the goal of promoting health and education in underprivileged societies. The BTF is a Washington State nonprofit organization exempt from taxation pursuant to Section 501(c)(3) of the Internal Revenue Code. BTF has founded multiple programs in underdeveloped and developing countries to improve access to healthcare. Recent accomplishments include building a 25-bed cancer hospital in Nepal in 2018 and breaking ground on their new 200-bed facility in 2022.

Current projects

Upcoming Conferences of 2023:

BTF ASH Annual Meeting Review Portland: January 6-7, 2023 at the DoubleTree by Hilton, Portland, OR. This conference allows professionals an opportunity to discuss current research and advances in the field of blood disorders and hematologic malignancies with colleagues and key opinion leaders. Expert faculty will place key abstract findings from the 64th American Society of Hematology (ASH) Annual Meeting into clinical context and discuss how the results may change the current standard of care. 

Highlights from SABCS: January 21, 2023. Management of breast cancer is rapidly evolving. A number of potentially practice-changing abstracts are expected to be presented during the 2022 San Antonio Breast Cancer Symposium (SABCS 2022) in December, 2022. At this in-person oncology conference held in at the Grand Hyatt in Seattle,  Highlights from SABCS 2022, expert faculty will place abstract findings from the SABCS 2022 annual meeting into clinical context and discuss how the results may change the current standard of care for breast cancer patients. 

San Diego Multidisciplinary Thoracic Oncology Symposium 2023: February 3-4, 2023 in San Diego, CA. This CME-accredited activity “San Diego Multidisciplinary Thoracic Oncology Symposium: Patient-centered approach to improve outcomes” features leading experts in thoracic malignancies who will provide a comprehensive overview of current and emerging strategies for management of lung cancer (NSCLC, SCLC), mesothelioma, and thymic malignancies. The goal of this activity is to improve the knowledge and competence of learners to apply practice-changing clinical data and expert recommendations to optimize clinical outcomes for patients with thoracic malignancies. The program features in-depth discussion and analysis of the latest scientific findings and practice-changing advances in molecular testing and targeted-therapies for thoracic oncology. Expert faculty will aim to place the role of different therapeutic agents in clinical context and discuss how to utilize these therapeutic options to effectively contribute to patient care. 

BTF ASH Annual Meeting Review Coeur d'Alene: March 3-4, 2023, at the Coeur d'Alene Resort, Coeur d'Alene, ID. The 2023 Highlights of ASH is a CME-accredited, in-person hematology conference featuring leading experts in the field. This conference allows professionals an opportunity to discuss current research and advances in the field of blood disorders and hematologic malignancies with colleagues and key opinion leaders. Expert faculty will place key abstract findings from the 64th ASH Annual Meeting into clinical context and discuss how the results may change the current standard of care. The goals of this conference are to review and critically assess practice-changing results of practice-changing clinical data and expert recommendations to optimize clinical outcomes for the patients. 

2023 BTF Multidisciplinary Breast Cancer Conference: April 1, 2023 in Peoria, IL. The “BTF Multidisciplinary Breast Cancer Conference” is a CME-accredited activity featuring experts in breast cancer. The goal of this activity is to improve the knowledge and competence of learners to apply practice-changing clinical data and expert recommendations to optimize clinical outcomes for patients with breast cancer. The program features in-depth discussion and analysis of the latest scientific findings and practice-changing advances in field. Expert faculty will aim to place the role of different therapeutic agents in clinical context and discuss how to utilize these therapeutic options to effectively contribute to patient care. 

The annual oncology conference, 2023 Summit on Cancer Health Disparities: April 28-30, 2023, at the Grand Hyatt Seattle. This annual oncology conference, 2023 Summit on Cancer Health Disparities: Reframing and addressing barriers to adoption of precision oncology, will feature lectures, panel discussions and debates among leaders across the spectrum of cancer care delivery. This conference will bring together oncology professionals, cancer disparity researchers, and other stakeholders to discuss the factors leading to cancer health disparities and ways to overcome the impact of these factors to optimize outcomes of cancer patients. 

Binaytara Foundation Cancer Center: The Binaytara Foundation opened the Binaytara Foundation Cancer Center on December 17, 2018, in Janakpur in Nepal. It is the first cancer center in the region, and will provide cutting-edge treatment to patients while also serving as a hub for research and education. The center was desperately needed in the region, with the nearest cancer center a full day's drive away in Kathmandu. It is the only public state-of-the-art cancer center in Nepal's Province No. 2, which is the most densely populated province in the country. The center serves a population area of about 15 million, including those from neighboring provinces and India. The Binaytara Foundation Cancer Center (BTFCC) in Janakpur, Nepal will be expanding to a 200-bed facility to help more patients by providing cutting-edge, evidence based, compassionate cancer care to patients of Madhesh and neighboring states of Nepal and India – a population of 25 million. On April 15, 2022, the Binaytara Foundation Cancer Center held a groundbreaking ceremony for the first phase of building. The new hospital is slated to be finished by 2025 and is anticipated to serve around 25,000 patients per year.  

International Journal of Cancer Care and Delivery (IJCCD): This publication is an open-access (CC BY-SA) peer-reviewed online journal that publishes a wide range of scientific articles focused on improving the care of cancer patients by minimizing or eliminating barriers to care delivery. We invite researchers, clinicians, and innovators from anywhere in the world who have designed, implemented, or evaluated innovative systems, processes, guidelines, technologies, clinical audits and quality improvement projects to submit related articles for review and publication. The journal encourages the submission of high-quality manuscripts covering all aspects of cancer care and care delivery. 

The International Conference on Advances in Hematology and Oncology (ICAHO): ICAHO is an annual conference for medial professionals generally held in August of each year in Coeur d'Alene, Idaho. The conference's aim is to improve the care of hematology and oncology patients by providing attendees with new updates in the field. There are opportunities provided to submit research abstracts, with accepted abstracts appearing in the Anticancer Research Journal. Recent hashtags for the ICAHO conferences include #ICAHO2017 and #ICAHO2018. The conference agenda is geared toward the following:
 Hematologists
 Medical Oncologists
 Radiation Oncologists
 Surgeons
 Primary Care Providers (Internists, Family practitioners, NP, PA)
 Oncology Nurses
 Pharmacists
 Basic Science Researchers
 Other healthcare professionals involved in the management of cancer patients.

Northwest Cancer Summit: BTF hosts periodic free public meetings in Northwest Washington designed to educate cancer patients. The summits, called Northwest Cancer Summit: Empowering Patients and Demystifying Cancer, facilitate discussion among cancer patients, their family members, caregivers, healthcare professionals and other experts to help. Summits are held periodically within Whatcom and Skagit Counties of Washington. Speakers and topics vary by event.

Northwest Cancer Climb: This annual fundraising event takes participants with hiking to the top of Oyster Dome, a trail near Bellingham, Wash. Registered participants receive a free t-shirt and are also entered to win prizes upon reaches the summit. Proceeds benefit BTF's programs.

Past projects

Medical Research Grant: With the overview of exploring the medical sciences and evidence-based practice where financial barriers restrict them, BTF awarded grants for medical research in underdeveloped and developing nations including Nepal and India. The program started in 2008 and was awarded every year until 2015.

Cervical Cancer Screening: BTF partnered with Cancer Care Nepal to develop a screening program for low- and middle-income women ages 30 to 60 who live in the rural and suburban areas of Kathmandu and Lalitpur Districts, Nepal. The cervical cancer screening program was conducted over a six-month period starting in May 2014. More than 1,000 women were screened for cervical cancer.

BTF Telemedicine Project: Using wireless video consultation, experts from the U.S. volunteered in weekly telemedicine session with physicians in Manipal College of Medical Sciences in Pokhara, Nepal, between March 2010 and March 2012.

BTF Scholarship: The first project was launched March 31, 2007, when BTF distributed uniforms and stationery to 33 underprivileged students of Yog Kumar Secondary School, Blaba- Sarpallo, Mahottari, Nepal. BTF scholarships were also provided to 44 school children in 2008.

BTF-UIC (University of Illinois at Chicago) Telelecture Series: The university and BTF conducted a specialty telemedicine review course in hematological malignancies to provide physicians from developing countries with information on recent advances in management.

Bone Marrow Transplant Center: The bone marrow transplant (BMT) program is a joint venture between BTF, UIC Center for Global Health, University of Illinois Hospital and Health Sciences System, and the Civil Service Hospital. They have partnered in a project to develop the first Blood and Marrow Stem Cell Transplant (BMT) Center in Nepal. BTF provided financial support for the training of two physicians and a nurse from Nepal at the UIC Medical Center Chicago for this project. BTF also supported the training of one physician in clinical genetics.

Funding
Funding is acquired through grants, sponsorships, and donations.

Funding details
Funding details as of 2018:

Assets
As of 2018, the Binaytara Foundation had net assets of $159,452.

References

Medical and health foundations in the United States
Non-profit organizations based in Washington (state)
United Nations Economic and Social Council
Cancer organisations based in Nepal
2007 establishments in Nepal